Central Ostrobothnia is a region in Finland. It borders the regions of Ostrobothnia, North Ostrobothnia, Central Finland and South Ostrobothnia.

Historical provinces

Municipalities 

The region of Central Ostrobothnia is made up of eight municipalities, of which two have city status (marked in bold).

Kaustinen sub-region:
Halsua (1,250)
Kaustinen (4,266)
Lestijärvi (842)
Perho (2,923)
Toholampi (3,480)
Veteli (3,396)

Kokkola sub-region:
Kannus (5,733)
Kokkola (46,714)

Politics 
Results of the 2019 Finnish parliamentary election in Central Ostrobothnia:

 Centre Party   31.09%
 Finns Party   19.60%
 Social Democratic Party   16.06%
 National Coalition Party   7.42%
 Christian Democrats   7.29%
 Swedish People's Party   6.26%
 Green League   6.03%
 Left Alliance   4.11%
 Blue Reform   0.80%
 Seven Star Movement   0.36%
 Other parties   0.98%

External links 

 Central Ostrobothnia Regional Council website

 
Western Finland Province
Ostrobothnia Central